SimplePlanes is a simulation video game developed and published by the American indie studio Jundroo LLC. SimplePlanes followed the release of SimplePhysics and SimpleRockets and preceded Juno: New Origins and SimplePlanes VR. The game was first released on Mac OS X and Microsoft Windows and was ported to iOS and Android later. It was released onto Steam on the 17th of December 2015 after going through the Steam Greenlight process. The game received mixed reviews from users and video game reviewers, with the main downfalls mentioned the most being the "slippery controls" and the graphical design. However, it is known for its innovative, though sometimes complex, building mechanics. From 2014 until 2022, SimplePlanes has got 11 updates (1.1 - 1.11). The latest version, 1.11, is released on October 2021.

Gameplay

In SimplePlanes the player is given the freedom of building anything they want to create using the materials and objects provided, and players can additionally use XML modifications (save editing) on their creation. Planes (or other creations) created by the community can also be downloaded from the SimplePlanes.com website, which has social-network like features: player profiles with their creations, aircraft rating via upvotes, forums, and a gallery of all designs.

An outstanding feature of SimplePlanes is the procedural building system. Most building games have structures made out of parts whose shape cannot be changed. While SimplePlanes has such blocks, most parts can be reshaped by the player to make the complex curves of modern aircraft. The fuselage block allows to set a cross section, corner style (hard corners or different variations of curved ones), length and offsets of a fuselage section, and the fuselage can smoothly blend between different cross-sections. This technique, of course, can be used not only to create fuselages, but almost any shape. The sections can be hollow, or feature intakes and nose cones and side cuts. The wings are made in a similar matter, the player specifying the span, chords and offsets of a wing section. Control surfaces can be customized and be bound to different inputs. Aerodynamics, weights and fuel volumes will be automatically updated when parts are modified.

Parts like engines, rotators, wheels and cannons are also highly customizable, and the player can change the size, power, controls, etc. of these components. Custom cockpit instrumentation can be created and made to display flight parameters. Moving parts, such as actuated doors, bomb bays, and custom landing gear can be created with the help of rotators and pistons. The game provides a scripting language called FunkyTrees (FT). An FT script takes player inputs and flight parameters as input, processes them via mathematical and logical functions, and its output is used to control a part, such as setting engine thrust. These can be used to create complex moving parts, autopilot-like features, and much more. Currently, adding FT functions to a craft requires save editing or mods.

While building an aircraft, the player must balance lift, thrust, payload, fuel, etc. They also must be sure the aircraft is stable and balanced, and that exhausting fuel will not change its center of mass so that the aircraft becomes unstable. By modifying the design, the player can adjust the performance of the aircraft however they need.

When the creation or build is finished, the player can fly/drive/sail it around the map which contains five different islands with unique features, (4 on IOS or Android) and/or upload it to the SimplePlanes website. The five islands each provide a different experience to the player, with interactive targets. Each island has a unique name, such as Maywar, Krakabloa, Snowstone or Wright. The islands include airports and other ground objects. Ships appear on the map and the player can land on them or attack them. The game also gives players the ability to build cars, boats, trains and mechanical objects. SimplePlanes contains challenges which the player can do. The challenges involve short tutorial-type activities (such as the "take-off tutorial" and the "landing tutorial") but can get more advanced with missions, such as "SAM Evasion" (a 4-stage level which gets increasingly difficult) and "Trench Run" (a race through a canyon-like area on the game map).> There are also weapons (bombs, wing guns and miniguns, missiles, rockets and torpedoes) in the game for the player to use on their creations. Any part can be shot off, and because all vehicles are modular, they will appropriately react to damage (e.g. a plane can lose its engine in combat and the player may try to pilot the aircraft to safety without power). Some parts can start burning or explode if hit by weapons or as a result of a collision.

Mods can include custom parts for vehicles, new UI and tools, and also custom maps and challenges, including real or fictional terrain. Multiple tool mods have been added into the base game, and in some occasions their creators were hired to work for Jundroo. On PC, Mac and Linux (and formerly Android) SimplePlanes mods can be downloaded from SimplePlanes.com, and can be activated from the main menu. Some mods are also hosted on the Steam Workshop. Mods are created with a special Unity plugin that is shipped with the game.

Location

Location is a spawn point where player can spawn their aircraft. There are 3 types of Location:

 Default: The spawn point is already featured. 
 Discovered: Player must fly over them in order to feature it. 
 Custom: Player can add them freely. 

On 1.11, there are 8 Default Locations and 21 Discovered Locations. They are located on many islands:

 Wright Isles (3 Default, 3 Discovered) 
 Krakabloa (5 Default) 
 Snowstone (6 Discovered) 
 Sky Park City (4 Discovered) 
 Maywar Island (7 Discovered)

SimplePlanes VR

SimplePlanes VR (often abbreviated SPVR) is another game for VR headsets that sold separately on Steam. It was released on 17 December 2021. The game supports Valve Index, HTC Vive, Oculus Rift, Windows Mixed Reality and is in App Lab for the Meta Quest 2. With the player stick, the player can interact with many buttons and levers. Unlike SimplePlanes, players cannot build or edit any aircraft but they can download VR-friendly aircraft from its website.

Website curators

Website curators have a very important role of "curating" crafts which work in SimplePlanes VR. If a craft is curated, it will receive 30 points upon upvote instead of 15. A craft which works in VR is built up of cockpit parts which are all interactive, making a smooth and immersive VR experience.

Development
Following the release of popular games SimpleRockets and SimplePhysics, Jundroo LLC released SimplePlanes on Windows and Mac OSX. Soon after it was ported to iOS and Android. The Windows and OSX versions were first sold on Gumroad but when SimplePlanes was released onto Valve's Steam on 17 December 2015 after going through the Steam Greenlight process, all sales were moved there. All purchasers from Gumroad received a free Steam key. Mac copies were also sold via the Mac App Store. The people who purchased the game through this method had to email the receipt to get the Steam key. The game received regular updates with new parts and locations, but the update rate became slower when the developers switched focus to Juno: New Origins and SimplePlanes VR.

Reception

SimplePlanes received "mixed or average" reviews, according to Metacritic, where it garnered a score of 67/100. The biggest issue critics had was the process of building. Nadia Oxford, a writer for Gamezebo gave SimplePlanes a 4/5 for its realistic flight challenges, sandbox mode and the amount of building options. The review was weighed down by the lack of tutorials and how "getting pieces to fit together doesn't always go as planned". Jordan Minor from 148Apps criticised the game for its "slippery controls" and he noted the environment was "ugly, muddy and blocky". He compared the graphics to "a poor man's Wii Sports resort" and said the planes looked like small wooden toys with the best compliment he could give the game being "who knows if the aerodynamic knowledge players learn from SimplePlanes can actually transfer over into the real world? But, gameplay and visual gripes aside, the fact that it at least feels like it can is probably the best compliment this game can get". Ben Schwan, a writer for the German website Heise Online also criticised the building mechanics.  Mark Steighner, a writer for Hardcore Gamer did not criticise the controls but instead commented on the lack of charisma that games like Kerbal Space Program have. He also addressed the novelty issue and how after a while the game can get boring.

References

External links
 

2014 video games
IOS games
Android (operating system) software
General flight simulators
MacOS games
Steam Greenlight games
Video games developed in the United States
Windows games
Simulation video games
Open-world video games